Ian Graham Knott (born 2 October 1976) is an English former rugby league footballer who played from 1993 to 2005.

References

External links
XIII Heroes > Ian Knott Fundraiser – 27 & 28 July 2007
Wakefield Trinity Wildcats
Statistics at wolvesplayers.thisiswarrington.co.uk

1976 births
Living people
Leigh Leopards captains
Leigh Leopards players
Place of birth missing (living people)
Rugby league centres
Rugby league five-eighths
Rugby league fullbacks
Rugby league locks
Rugby league second-rows
Wakefield Trinity players
Warrington Wolves players